Richard Ashwell (died 1392) was an English politician.

He was a Member (MP) of the Parliament of England for Gloucester in 1391.

References

Year of birth missing
1392 deaths
14th-century English people
People from Gloucester
Members of the Parliament of England (pre-1707) for Gloucester